Spas Zlatev (born 14 May 1964) is a Bulgarian biathlete. He competed at the 1984 Winter Olympics and the 1992 Winter Olympics.

References

External links
 

1964 births
Living people
Bulgarian male biathletes
Bulgarian male cross-country skiers
Olympic biathletes of Bulgaria
Olympic cross-country skiers of Bulgaria
Biathletes at the 1984 Winter Olympics
Biathletes at the 1992 Winter Olympics
Cross-country skiers at the 1992 Winter Olympics
People from Samokov
Sportspeople from Sofia Province
20th-century Bulgarian people
21st-century Bulgarian people